The 2005–06 season was the 128th season in Bolton Wanderers F.C.'s existence and their fifth consecutive year in the top-flight. This article covers the period from 1 July 2005 to 30 June 2006.

Having finished sixth the previous season, Bolton had qualified for the UEFA Cup for the first time in their history.

Season summary
In June 2005, Allardyce's assistant Phil Brown, left Bolton to take up the challenge of managing Derby County and he was replaced by coach Sammy Lee.

Off the field, with Bolton looking to get into Europe for the second successive season, Allardyce was being linked with the England manager's job. He was interviewed for the England manager vacancy during the Spring, though the news broke that the FA wanted Brazilian Luiz Felipe Scolari. In the end it came down to Allardyce or Steve McClaren. Between the middle of March and the beginning of April with rumours surrounding Allardyce in terms of taking the England job, Bolton's form hit an unexpected slump with five successive defeats seeing the side slide to eighth.

Final league table

First-team squad
Squad at end of season

Left club during season

Reserve squad

Matches

Results by matchday

August

September

October

November

December

January

February

March

April

May

Statistics

Appearances
Bolton used a total of 26 players during the season.

Top scorers

References

 

2005–06
2005–06 FA Premier League by team